Fuenmayor is a Spanish surname. Notable people with the surname include:

Denisse Fuenmayor (born 1979), Venezuelan softball player
Johana Fuenmayor, Venezuelan fencer
Juan Fuenmayor (born 1979), Venezuelan footballer
Manuel Fuenmayor (born 1980), Venezuelan javelin thrower
Ruy Fernández de Fuenmayor (1603–1651), Spanish soldier and colonial governor

Spanish-language surnames